O' Level were a British punk and indie band, founded in 1976 by Ed Ball with friends John and Gerard Bennett. The group's name refers to the 'O'-Level of the British General Certificate of Education.

History
Along with the early Television Personalities, 'O' Level's singles are synonymous with a late 1970s DIY-indie sound that emanated from West London, mostly because the personnel of both bands were almost identical.
 
Fuelled by punk and the early Beatles, 'O' Level was formed in 1976 by Ed Ball with friends from the London Oratory School, John and Gerard Bennett, on drums and bass guitar respectively. Together they played the usual round of school discos and youth centres, until fellow school chum and sixties enthusiast Daniel Treacy invited Edward to join him in the studio to record a single. Just to be on the safe side, Edward brought John and Gerard as well, resulting in the TV Personalities single, "14th Floor".
 
The following week, Ball, the Bennetts and friend Richard Scully recorded "Pseudo Punk", "O Levels" and "East Sheen" as ‘O' Level, released in November 1977. It took Treacy longer to raise the pre-requisite funds to press "14th floor", which was finally released in 1978. In March of that year, John and Gerard Bennett started their own band Reacta, leaving Ball with the name ‘O' Level.
 
Exactly one year after their debut recording sessions, Daniel and Edward returned to the studio, this time to create the breakthrough Where's Bill Grundy Now EP as the TV Personalities, featuring the song "Part Time Punks" (in which 'O' Level are mentioned). The following week, Ball went back to record – this time by himself – a second and final ‘O' Level single, The Malcolm McLaren Lifestory EP, featuring "We Love Malcolm". Both EPs appeared in late 1978.
 
From here, it was just a name change to the Teenage Filmstars and invitations to Daniel Treacy and Joseph Foster.

Discography

Singles and EPs
 East Sheen("East Sheen" / "Pseudo Punk"
7" Psycho Records (PSYCHO 1) 1978)
 The Malcolm McLaren Life Story EP("We Love Malcolm" / "Leave Me" / "Everybody's On Revolver Tonight" / "Stairway To Boredom" – 7" Kings Road Records (KR 002) 1978)

Compilations
 1977 – 1980 A Day in the Life of Gilbert and George
CD Rev-Ola (CREV 005CD) 1992
"(There's A) Cloud Over Liverpool" / "I Helped Patrick McGoohan Escape" / "The Odd Man Out" / "I Apologise" / "We're Not Sorry" / "Sometimes Good Guys Don't Follow Trends" / "Storybook Beginnings" / "The Sun Never Sets" / "Dressing Up For The Cameras" / "He's A Professional" / "The John Peel March" / "East Sheen Revisited" / "Pseudo Punk" / "O Levels" / "We Love Malcolm" / "Leave Me" / "Everybody's On Revolver Tonight" / "Stairway To Boredom" / "Many Unhappy Returns" / "I Love To Clean My Polaris Missile" / "Don't Play God With My Life" / "East Sheen"

See also
 The Times (band)

References

External links
 For more on O' Level, The Times and Edward Ball  

English punk rock groups
English post-punk music groups
Creation Records artists
Musical groups established in 1976
1976 establishments in England